Fareda Banda is a Zimbabwean academic. She is currently a professor of law at SOAS University of London.

Biography 
Banda studied law at the University of Zimbabwe where she graduated amongst the top three. This lead her to winning a Beit Fellowship to the University of Oxford, where she completed her doctorate on the topic of "access to justice for women". Upon completing her doctorate, Banda worked for the Law Commission of England of Wales before returning to Oxford as a post-doctoral researcher.

She has been a professor at SOAS University of London since 1996 at the School of Oriental and African Studies. Her main areas of work include the human rights of women and family law in Africa.

Career 
Banda is a former collaborating researcher with UNRISD where she did work on Women's Rights.

Apart from her work teaching at SOAS University of London, Banda also teaches a summer programme at the University of Oxford on women's rights. She has also taught programmes around the world in cities including Harare, Kampala, Onati and Oslo.

References 

Zimbabwean academics
Zimbabwean women lawyers
20th-century Zimbabwean lawyers
Living people
Year of birth missing (living people)
Academics of SOAS University of London
21st-century Zimbabwean lawyers